Joshua Norris (born May 5, 1999) is an American professional ice hockey center currently playing for the Ottawa Senators of the National Hockey League (NHL). He was drafted in the first round of the 2017 NHL Entry Draft by the San Jose Sharks and in 2018 was traded to the Senators as part of a package for All-Star defenseman Erik Karlsson.

Playing career
Norris first played midget hockey with the Oakland Jr. Grizzlies before gaining the attention of the U.S. National Development Team. He played with Team USA in the United States Hockey League for two seasons through to the 2016–17 season. Norris committed to play college hockey with the Michigan Wolverines of the NCAA on September 21, 2016.

On June 23, 2017, Norris was drafted in the first round, 19th overall, of the 2017 NHL Entry Draft by the San Jose Sharks. He was traded to the Ottawa Senators on September 13, 2018, as part of a package that brought Erik Karlsson to the Sharks.

On January 17, 2019, it was announced that Norris would miss the remainder of the 2018–19 season due to an injury sustained during the 2019 World Junior Ice Hockey Championships. He finished the season with 10 goals and nine assists in 17 games. His 10 goals were tied for a team-high and ranked second in points behind teammate Quinn Hughes. Norris' 10 goals were tied for seventh-most in the nation and third-most in the Big Ten Conference.

On May 27, 2019, the Senators signed Norris to a three-year, entry-level contract. Norris was assigned to Ottawa's AHL affiliate Belleville Senators. His 61 points in 56 games earned him a promotion to Ottawa and he played his NHL debut on February 22, 2020, against the Montreal Canadiens. Norris remained with Ottawa after the 2020–21 training camp. Norris scored his first NHL point in the home opener on January 15, 2021, and scored his first goal on January 19. Norris capped off his rookie season with finishing top three in rookie point scoring as well as finishing second in goals scored behind only the eventual Calder winner Kirill Kaprizov. On June 29 it was announced that Norris had been selected to be on the All-Rookie team. 

Five games into the 2022–23 season, Norris suffered a shoulder injury, causing him to miss three months. Despite initial fears that the injury would sideline him for the remainder of the season, Norris was able to return to the Senators in January; however, he re-injured his shoulder after three games, necessitating surgery and ending his season.

International play

Norris competed at the 2017 IIHF World U18 Championships where he helped Team USA win a gold medal. The following year, Norris was named to Team USA to compete at the 2018 World Junior Ice Hockey Championships. He played in all seven games on the way to a bronze medal. Following Team USA's 4–2 defeat to Team Sweden in the semifinals, Norris was named U.S. Player of the Game.

On December 23, 2018, Norris was selected to compete at the 2019 World Junior Ice Hockey Championships, and was later named an alternate captain alongside Michigan teammate Quinn Hughes.

Personal life

Norris is the son of Canadian former NHL player Dwayne Norris and his American wife Traci. Josh spent much of his first 11 years growing up in Germany, where his father played professionally, and he speaks fluent German. The family returned to the United States after the 2006-07 season and settled in Oxford, Michigan, where his father was his coach in youth hockey.

Norris is a good friend of Ottawa Senators player Brady Tkachuk. The two played together on USNTDP teams and in the world junior championships. Norris is roommates with Senators teammates, Brady Tkachuk and Tim St%C3%BCtzle.

Career statistics

Regular season and playoffs

International

Awards and honors

References

External links

 

1999 births
American men's ice hockey centers
Belleville Senators players
Ice hockey players from Michigan
Living people
Michigan Wolverines men's ice hockey players
National Hockey League first-round draft picks
Ottawa Senators players
People from Oxford, Michigan
San Jose Sharks draft picks
USA Hockey National Team Development Program players
American expatriates in Germany
American expatriate ice hockey players in Canada
American sportspeople of Canadian descent